Vidar Jusnes Vang (born 22 September 1976) is a Norwegian songwriter and musician. He has recorded eight full-length albums.

Early life 
Vidar Vang grew up in Bjerkvik, in Northern Norway. He started to write songs in his teens.

Musical career 
In 1998 Vidar Vang released his unofficial debut album Blue, recorded in his hometown Bjerkvik. The album was sold at concerts throughout northern Norway.

In the fall of 1999, Vidar Vang recorded his first demo with a band, at Hønsehuset Studio in Bodø. This demo gave him and his band the opportunity to play by:Larm in Bergen in 2000, and the Norwegian Wood festival in Oslo the following summer.

In August 2000 Vidar Vang moved to Oslo. In 2001, after playing by:Larm in Tromsø, the Quart Festival and the main stage at Norwegian Wood, he got signed to EMI. Vidar Vang and his band went on their first Norwegian tour in the fall of 2001, before they entered Juke Joint Studio at Notodden, together with producers Seasick Steve and Cato “Salsa” Thomassen to record his official debut album.

In September 2002 Vidar Vang made his official recording debut releasing the album Rodeo. Rodeo received a Norwegian Grammy nomination the year after. The single "Under Six Strings" has become one of Vidar Vang’s signature songs.

In 2004 Vidar Vang released the follow-up to Rodeo, Stand Up Straight. Vidar Vang’s band, childhood friends from Bjerkvik and Bodø, now had become The Northern Men. "Here It Is" was released as a single and received extensive radio play in the fall of 2004. The album songs "Happy", and the duet with Ingrid Olava "Highways of My Mind", were also released as singles.

On the eponymous Vidar Vang (2006), Vidar Vang recorded his songs with a more acoustic sound than on previous albums. Vidar and The Northern Men went separate ways in 2005 and Vang subsequently recorded with other musicians. The single "Stand Up" is one of Vidar Vang’s most known and played songs.

Before and after the release of Vidar Vang, Vidar Vang toured Norway and Sweden, and also supported The Waterboys and Madrugada on their European tours.

In 2010, Vidar Vang released his fifth album, Sleepless Songs, produced by Frode Jacobsen and Alexander Kloster-Jensen. Album singles were "10 Below" and the duet "Love, Love, Love" with Tift Merritt.

On Sidewalk Silhouettes (2012), Vidar Vang recorded 18 songs alone with his guitar, before him and his producer, Cato “Salsa” Thomassen, overdubbed them lightly with old, analog synthesizers, sparse drum machines and electric guitars.

Starting with the 2015 album Vårres egen lille krig, he dropped English as the primary language and switched to his native Norwegian.

Discography
Albums
 Blue (1999)
 Rodeo (2002) (also on limited edition vinyl plus CD with five bonus tracks)
 Stand Up Straight (2004)
 Vidar Vang (2006)
 Sleepless Songs (2010)
 Sidewalk Silhouettes (2012)
 Vårres egen lille krig (2015)
 8530 Bjerkvik (2018)

EPs
 Vidar Vang & friemann (2001)
 Under Six Strings (2002)

References

External links
 
 Vidar Vang official homepage

1976 births
Musicians from Narvik
Norwegian singer-songwriters
Living people
21st-century Norwegian singers